Basseneville is a commune in the Calvados department in the Normandy region of north-western France.

The inhabitants of the commune are known as Bassenevillais or Bassenevillaises.

Geography
Basseneville is located in the Pays d'Auge some 12 km east of Caen and 8 km south-east of Cabourg. Access to the commune is by the D675 road from Goustranville in the east which passes through the south of the commune continuing south-west to Saint-Samson. The D224A also comes from Saint-Samson and passes through the commune continuing north-east to join the D224 just north-east of the commune. The A13 autoroute passes through the commune from east to west but has no exit - the nearest exit is Exit  Dozulé to the east of the commune which has no direct access the commune and Exit  to the south-west which connects to the D675. Apart from the village there are the hamlets of L'Église, Les Marettes, Saint-Richer, and La Chollerie. The commune is entirely farmland.

The Dives river forms the north-western border of the commune as it flows north-east to join the sea at Cabourg. The Grand Canal forms the south-eastern border of the commune.

History
Basseneville appears as Bafneville on the 1750 Cassini Map and as Bosneville on the 1790 version.

A railway station on the Caen to Dozulé-Putot line existed in the commune from 1881 to 1938. The line that passed through the commune was finally closed in 1943.

Administration

List of Successive Mayors

Demography
In 2017 the commune had 257 inhabitants.

Culture and heritage

Religious heritage
The Chapel of Saint Richer contains several items that are registered as historical objects:
A Chalice with Paten (18th century)
A Trunk (17th century)
A Painting with frame: Crucifixion (17th century)

The Parish Church of Notre-Dame also contains several items that are registered as historical objects:
A Tabernacle (17th century)
A Painting: The Holy Family (18th century)
A Painting with frame: Holy Family (18th century)
An Altar, Retable, and 2 doors (1719)
A Lectern (1721)

Notable people linked to the commune
 Jean-Victor Durand-Duquesnay (1785 at Basseneville - 1862), Normandy botanist
 Pierre (François-Amand) Bazin (1796 at Basseneville - 1865)

See also
Communes of the Calvados department

References

Communes of Calvados (department)